"Tom, Tom, the Piper's Son" is a popular English language nursery rhyme. It has a Roud Folk Song Index number of 19621.

Lyrics
Modern versions of the rhyme include:

Tom, Tom, the piper's son,
Stole a pig, and away did run;
The pig was eat
And Tom was beat,
And Tom went [or "which sent him"] crying [or "roaring", or "howling", in some versions]
Down the street.

The 'pig' mentioned in the song is almost certainly not a live animal but rather a kind of pastry, often made with an apple filling, smaller than a pie. And the meaning of the rhyme involves a naughty boy named Tom whose father was a piper, and he steals the "pig", eats it, and after his father (or someone else) physically chastises him, Tom cries all the way down the street.

Another version of the rhyme is:
Tom, Tom, the piper's son,
Stole a pig, and away he run.
Tom run here,
Tom run there,
Tom run through the village square.

This rhyme is often conflated with a separate and longer rhyme:

Tom, he was a piper's son,
He learnt to play when he was young,
And all the tune that he could play
Was 'over the hills and far away';
Over the hills and a great way off,
The wind shall blow my top-knot off.

Tom with his pipe made such a noise,
That he pleased both the girls and boys,
They all stopped to hear him play,
'Over the hills and far away'.

Tom with his pipe did play with such skill
That those who heard him could never keep still;
As soon as he played they began for to dance,
Even the pigs on their hind legs would after him prance.

As Dolly was milking her cow one day,
Tom took his pipe and began to play;
So Dolly and the cow danced 'The Cheshire Round',
Till the pail was broken and the milk ran on the ground.

He met old Dame Trot with a basket of eggs,
He used his pipe and she used her legs;
She danced about till the eggs were all broke,
She began for to fret, but he laughed at the joke.

Tom saw a cross fellow was beating an ass,
Heavy laden with pots, pans, dishes, and glass;
He took out his pipe and he played them a tune,
And the poor donkey's load was lightened full soon.

Origins
Both rhymes were first printed separately in a Tom the Piper's Son, a chapbook produced around 1795 in London, England. The origins of the shorter and better known rhyme are unknown.

The second, longer rhyme was an adaptation of an existing verse which was current in England around the end of the seventeenth and beginning of the eighteenth centuries. The following verse, known as "The Distracted Jockey's Lamentations", may have been written for (but not included in) Thomas D'Urfey's play The Campaigners (1698):

Jockey was a Piper's Son,
And fell in love when he was young;
But all the Tunes that he could play,
Was, o'er the Hills, and far away,
And 'Tis o'er the Hills, and far away,
'Tis o'er the Hills, and far away,
'Tis o'er the Hills, and far away,
The Wind has blown my Plad away.

This verse seems to have been adapted for a recruiting song designed to gain volunteers for the Duke of Marlborough's campaigns about 1705, with the title "The Recruiting Officer; or The Merry Volunteers", better today known as "Over the Hills and Far Away", in which the hero is called Tom.

External links

English nursery rhymes
Pigs in literature
English folk songs
English children's songs
Songs about fictional male characters
Songs about pigs
Songs about crime
Songs about criminals
Traditional children's songs
1795 songs